Canella is a monospecific genus containing the species Canella winterana, a tree native to the Caribbean from the Florida Keys to Barbados. Its bark is used as a spice similar to cinnamon, giving rise to the common names cinnamon bark, wild cinnamon, and white cinnamon.

The wood of Canella is very heavy and exceedingly hard, strong, and close-grained, with numerous thin, inconspicuous medullary rays; it is dark red-brown, and the thick sapwood consists of 25 to 30 layers of annual growth, light brown or yellow in color. The specific gravity of the absolutely dry wood grown in Florida is 0.9893; a cubic foot of the dry wood weighs 61.65 pounds.

Canella attains in Florida a height of 25 to 30 feet, with a straight trunk eight to 10 inches in diameter. On the mountains of Jamaica, it is said to grow sometimes to the height of 50 feet. The principal branches are slender, horizontal, and spreading, forming a compact round-headed top. The light gray bark of the trunk is an eighth of an inch thick, the surface is broken into many short thick scales rarely more than 2-3 in long, and about twice the thickness of the pale yellow, aromatic inner bark. The leaves are obovate, round or slightly emarginate at the apex, and contracted into a short, stout, grooved petiole; they are 3.5-5.0 in long, 1.5-2.0 in broad, bright deep green, and lustrous. The flowers open in the autumn, and the fruit ripens in March and April, when it is bright crimson, soft, and fleshy, and is eaten by many birds.

Name 
Canella, the diminutive of the Latin canna, a cane or reed, was first applied to the bark of the Old World tree cassia, Cinnamomum aromaticum, from the form of a roll or quill which it assumed in drying, and was later transferred to the West Indian tree. The genus Canella was erected in 1756 by Patrick Browne. The species epithet winterana is an artifact from a period when this plant was confused with Winter's bark, Drimys winteri, which is itself named for William Winter.

Distribution
Canella is widely distributed, and not uncommon on the Florida Keys, where it was first discovered by J. L. Blodgett. It generally grows under the shade of larger trees in dense forests composed of Sideroxylon, Lysiloma, Swietenia, Bursera, Hypelate, Dipholis, and Nectandra.

Canella was one of the first American trees to attract the attention of Europeans, and it is mentioned in the accounts of many of the early voyages to America:

The white bark, the brilliant deep green foliage, and crimson fruit make the Canella one of the most ornamental of the smaller south Florida trees. It was introduced into England in 1738, and was first cultivated in Europe by Philip Miller.

References

External links
 Canella  Plant Names  IPNI
 Canella  The Civil and Natural History of Jamaica  Patrick Browne  Authors  Botanicus

Canellales genera
Monotypic magnoliid genera
Spices
Trees of the Caribbean
Neotropical realm flora